Mobivia is a French based company group which focuses on car repairs, car accessories and car parts.

Its first store was in France in 1970 near Lille (Englos); during the 1980s the brand expanded its auto centers through France and abroad by entering the Spanish market. In 1986, it also launched its first brand product, Norauto Oil, while in the 1990s, the group expanded to Italy, Portugal, Argentina and Poland with the launch of more new Norauto brand products. In the 2000s, the group also created The Norauto Foundation and signed The European Road Safety Policy and in 2006, they expanded to the Hungarian market. In 2010 the original name Norauto was changed to Mobivia. Norauto remains a Mobivia brand name. In 2013, Norauto officially left Hungary.

Around the world

Note: Some stores may be under franchise.

Logo

See also
 List of French companies

References

External links
 Norauto Corporate Page with Key Data (Unupdated)
 Norauto France
 Norauto Spain
 Norauto Italy
 Norauto Portugal
 Norauto Argentina
 Norauto Poland
 Norauto Romania

Retail companies established in 1970
Automotive companies of France
Retail companies of France
1970 establishments in France